Yazur was a Palestinian Arab town located  east of Jaffa. Mentioned in 7th century BCE Assyrian texts, the village was a site of contestation between Muslims and Crusaders in the 12th-13th centuries.

During the Fatimid period in Palestine, a number of important people were born in Yazur. In modern times the town was the birthplace of Ahmed Jibril, the founder and current head of the Popular Front for the Liberation of Palestine – General Command (PFLP-GC).

Yazur was depopulated and mostly destroyed during the 1947–48 Civil War in Mandatory Palestine. The Israeli town of Azor was developed on the site.

History

Iron Age
The village is mentioned in the annals of the Assyrian ruler Sennacherib (704 – 681 BCE) as Azuro.

Fatimid, Crusader, Ayyubid and Mamluk eras
The Arab geographer Yaqut al-Hamawi (1179–1229) described Yazur as a small town that was the birthplace of several important figures during the Fatimid period. Most prominent among them was al-Hasan ibn ´Ali al-Yazuri, who became a Fatimid minister in 1050 CE. In the twelfth and thirteenth centuries CE, Muslim and Crusader forces fought for control of the village and it changed hands several times, before finally falling under the control of the Mamluks.

Ottoman era

During early Ottoman rule in Palestine, the revenues of the village of Yazur were in 1557 designated for the new waqf of Hasseki Sultan Imaret in Jerusalem, established by Hasseki Hurrem Sultan (Roxelana), the wife of Suleiman the Magnificent. In 1586, the Maqam Imam ´Ali in Yazur was seen by Jean Zuallart, who described it as follows: "....a little further was a square mosque with nine little cupolas. Across the road there is a well or cistern." 

In the 1596 tax records, Yazur was a village in the nahiya ("subdistrict") of Ramla, part of Sanjak of Gaza. It had a population 50 Muslim households, an estimated 275 persons. The villagers paid a fixed  tax rate of 33,3% for the crops that they cultivated, which included wheat, barley, fruit, and sesame, as well as on other types of property, such as goats and beehives; a total of 19,250 akçe. All of the revenue went to a Muslim charitable institution. In 1602, Seusenius described the Maqam Imam ´Ali as "a mosque with nine cupolas the one in the middle being the highest".

The Syrian Sufi teacher and traveller Mustafa al-Bakri al-Siddiqi (1688-1748/9), who travelled in the region in the first half of the eighteenth century, and Mustafa al-Dumyati (d. 1764) reported visiting the shrine of a sage called Sayyiduna ("our master") Haydara in Yazur.  The village appeared named Jazour on the map that Pierre Jacotin compiled in 1799 during the French campaign in Egypt and Syria.

In 1863 Victor Guérin visited. While the area was still under the rule of the Ottoman Empire in 1870, Charles Netter from Alliance Israélite Universelle founded the Mikveh Israel southeast of Jaffa. Through a firman of the sultan, he received land for the school. Until then the land had been cultivated by the fellahin of Yazur village. In a Survey of Western Palestine (1882), it is noted that, "Though the land belongs to the Government, the Fellahin, from long usage, have got to look upon it as virtually their own, and resent its occupation by any other person." The peasants became bitter enemies of the school farm.

In the late summer of 1870, the governor of Damascus visited Jaffa. Accompanied by Netter and two Templars, Christoph Hoffmann and Ernst Hardegg, the governor passed by Yazur:
While riding between Natter's property and the city, the Wali was beset by Arab women and men who begged him, holding onto the reigns {sic, should be 'reins'} of his mule, and onto his trousers, to help them regain their rights, the Jews were taking away their land; here they pointed at Natter, who rode next to the Wali, screaming "the Jews, the Jews." The Pasha, riding on the other side, asked Ernst for his riding crop and chased them away himself. The Wali accepted a petition handed him by a shaykh, incidentally.

The PEF's Survey of Western Palestine reported that in 1882 the village structures were built of adobe brick, there were dispersed gardens and wells, and Yazur contained a domed shrine.

British Mandate era
Modern Yazur was divided into four quarters, one for each of four clans (hama´il, sing. hamula) that lived there. The houses were traditionally made of stone or adobe brick and straw and were built in groups called ahwash (pl. of hawsh, "courtyard"). Each house in such a group opened onto a common courtyard that had a single entrance, often an arched gate. Extended families lived in the ahwash.

The village had two elementary schools, one for boys (built in 1920) and another for girls (opened in 1933). The boys' school occupied 27 dunums (the bulk of which was allocated for training students in agronomy) and had its own artesian well. In 1947, 430 boys and 160 girls were registered in these schools. The remains of an old Crusader church built by Richard the Lionheart in 1191, called Castel des Plaines, were visible on a hill inside the village. The Crusader church had been rebuilt to serve as Yazur's mosque.

In the 1922 census of Palestine conducted by the British Mandate authorities, Yazur had a population of 1,284 residents, all Muslims. By the 1931 census, the population had increased to 2,337 inhabitants in 419 houses.

According to the 1945 census, Yazur had a population of 4,030, mostly Muslim Arabs, with a very small Arab Christian community of 20 people. Agriculture constituted the backbone of the economy; in 1944, citrus was planted on 6,272 dunums and 1,441 dunums were allocated to cereals. Agriculture was both rainfed and irrigated; 1,689 dunums were irrigated or used for orchards. During World War II, the villagers also started raising Holstein cows. By 1947 numerous artesian wells were being used for irrigation.

Lead-up to 1947-1948 war, and after
The [[Filastin (newspaper)|Filastin']] newspaper reported that on December 11, 1947, members of a pro-Zionist armed group drove at high speed through the town, throwing bombs at a barbershop and a coffeehouse. They did not cause any fatalities. However, Aref al-Aref reports that one week later, on 18 December, more Zionist militia returned, this time disguised as British soldiers. Driving along the main road they threw several bombs at a coffeehouse, killing six villagers. Filastin reported that on 30 December, another Zionist raiding party had tried to blow up village houses. This group was discovered by the village guards and driven away. More attacks followed in early 1948. 

The largest came on 12 February, when Yazur and Abu Kabir were attacked by Zionist mortars and machine-guns. Several houses in Yazur were destroyed. Attacks followed almost weekly, including on 20 February when Zionist forces attacked the village with tanks and armoured vehicles, destroying an ice factory, two houses, and killing one villager and wounding four.Morris, 2008, p. 100

During the Haganah's offensive Operation Hametz 28–30 April 1948, the population was forced from Yazur or killed. This was during the 1947–48 Civil War in Mandatory Palestine, weeks prior to the outbreak of the wider 1948 Arab-Israeli War. This operation was conducted against Yazur and a group of Arab villages east of Jaffa. According to the preparatory orders, the objective was "opening the way [for Jewish forces] to Lydda".
 
Though there was no explicit mention of the prospective treatment of the villagers, the order spoke of "cleansing the area" []. The final operational order stated: "Civilian inhabitants of places conquered would be permitted to leave after they are searched for weapons." Soldiers were instructed not to harm women and children "insofar as possible" and not to loot captured villages. Most of the village buildings were destroyed in the fighting.

The village today
According to Walid Khalidi, 1992, two Muslim shrines remain standing in the village. One is made of stone and its roof is topped with a dozen domes clustered around a more prominent dome at the center. A number of other structures and houses are also still intact; some are used, while others are vacant. One house, occupied by a Jewish family, is a two-storey concrete unit that has a rectangular door and a modified gabled roof.

According to Petersen, the small mosque/shrine located at a distance of some 50 meters from Maqam Imam ´Ali, on the opposite side of the road, was known as Shaykh al-Katanan. Inspected in 1991, it was found to be built on a square plan with a shallow dome resting on an octagonal drum. The building is entered through a doorway in the middle of the north side. Inside there are windows on the west and east side flanked by niches. In the middle of the south wall is a shallow niche, which was found decorated with inscriptions painted in henna.

According to Meron Benvenisti, 2000, the village of Yazur holds the venerated grave of Imam ´Ali, a famous miracle-worker. Another dozen places also claim to have his grave. The Yazur site is a massive building with a central dome encircled by nine smaller ones. It is most widely held to be the actual burial site of Imam ´Ali. His tomb is nearly the sole monument left in the village.

The tomb building is now used by Israelis for the Sha´arei Zion Synagogue and a seminary for Orthodox Jews. On the roof, beside the domes, a satellite dish has been installed to receive live religious broadcasts. There is an adjoining Muslim cemetery, where two or three broken gravestones are all that remain. It is now used by Jewish Israelis as a dump for "yard trash only."

Across the road, in the Holon industrial park, is located yet another Muslim holy site, this one deserted and falling to pieces.

Persons associated with Yazur

 Ahmed Jibril - founder and head of PFLP-GC
 Hassan ibn Ali al-Yazuri - The Sunni vizier and chief judge of Fatimid ruler Al-Mustansir Billah, from 1050-58

See also
 Depopulated Palestinian locations in Israel
 Salama (town)

References

Bibliography

 (pp. 32–33, 292)

 (pp. 5, 254, 489)
 
 

 (pp. 406-7)

 
 (p. 108 )
al-Qawuqji, F. (1972): Memoirs of al-Qawuqji, Fauzi in Journal of Palestine Studies 
"Memoirs, 1948, Part I" in 1, no. 4 (Sum. 72): 27-58., dpf-file, downloadable
"Memoirs, 1948, Part II" in 2, no. 1 (Aut. 72): 3-33., dpf-file, downloadable
 
Schölch, Alexander (1993): Palestine in Transformation, 1856–1882,'' ,

 
 (p. 141, 143 ff )
Yazur p. 11 & 112 in the 1585-edition

External links
Welcome To Yazur
Yazur, Zochrot
Survey of Western Palestine, Map 13: IAA,  Wikimedia commons
Yazur at Khalil Sakakini Cultural Center
Photo of Imam Ali Mosque, circa 1887

District of Jaffa
Arab villages depopulated prior to the 1948 Arab–Israeli War